Kala Bazar is a 1960 Hindi crime film produced by Dev Anand for Navketan Films.  Written and directed by Dev's younger brother Vijay Anand, the film starred Dev Anand, Waheeda Rehman, Vijay Anand, Chetan Anand, Nanda, Rashid Khan, Madan Puri, Leela Chitnis, Mumtaz Begum and Helen. S.D. Burman composed the music, while the lyrics were penned by Shailendra.

It was noted for having several of Bollywood's stars in a cameo at the film premiere of Mother India (1957), and it was also the only film to star the three Anand brothers together. It became a Superhit at the box office.

Plot
Kala Bazar (meaning "black market") essentially dealt with black marketing of movie tickets, which Dev Anand does in the film. The story follows the template of a protagonist who takes the wrong path to make money and then realizes his mistake, for which he has to pay back.

Raghuveer (Dev Anand) is a poor bus conductor who is fired from the job after getting into an argument with a passenger. With an ailing mother (Leela Chitnis) and two younger siblings to take care of, Raghuveer doesn't know how to provide for his family. When he passes by a cinema hall and sees Kalu (Rashid Khan) selling movie tickets, he gets an idea. Seeing that as a good source of quick money, he too decides to black market movie tickets. But for that, he needs capital to start with. So he robs Advocate Desai (Chetan Anand) of Rs 5000 and soon sets his own network of black marketers outside all prominent cinema-halls of Bombay.

First, he works with Kalu and at the premiere of Mother India, their tickets sell faster and faster as more film stars arrive – they include Dilip Kumar, Geeta Dutt, Guru Dutt, Kishore Kumar, Raaj Kumar, Rajendra Kumar, Lata Mangeshkar, Sohrab Modi, Mohammed Rafi, Nargis, Nadira and Nimmi. Finally, he sells his last ticket for 100 rupees when one ticket cost only 2 rupees.
Elated with his newfound business, Raghuveer and Kalu go from strength to strength, recruiting many poor and homeless thieves. When Ganesh (Madan Puri) dares to challenge him, Raghuveer beats him up. The next day, Ganesh agrees to work for Raghuveer. Now a wealthy man, Raghuveer buys a new, spacious flat for his family on Marine Drive. Things change when a group of students buy movie tickets from him. Alka (Waheeda Rehman) finds out that her friends bought them in black, and tears the tickets as she hates black marketing. This has a great impact on Raghuveer and he gets attracted towards Alka, who is standing nearby and watching. She was in love with her boyfriend, Nand Kumar Chattopadhyay (Vijay Anand) who promises her not to do it again.
Smitten with Alka, Raghuveer starts to follow her. So, when Nand gets a scholarship and travels overseas, Alka's parents decide to take her to Ooty to take her mind off Nand. Raghuveer sees this as a perfect opportunity and gets on the same cabin as her family and attempts to woo Alka on their trip to Ooty, but in vain. He sings "Apni To Har Aah Ek Toofan Hai", trying to flirt with Alka, while the song itself was veiled as a prayer. He also helps to cure Alka's father's back pain with a massage and soon, he becomes friends with the family. Though he is unable to win Alka, his feelings towards her makes him a changed man and he gives up the path of black marketing.

All that taken care of, he sets out to romance Alka, but she resists and turns away his love when she lies that she is engaged to Nand. Heartbroken, Raghuveer returns to Bombay to continue his business, but his love for Alka has changed him. When he left Alka in Ooty, he promised that he would never do anything bad. Raghuveer tries to convince his partners to stop black marketing and get an honest job, but they all eventually go back to their bad deeds. Raghuveer continues to try and earn an honest living and to his surprise, he meets Alka one day in Bombay. Alka, meanwhile, also falls for Raghuveer, but hesitates to tell him. Finally, she writes a letter to Nand, telling him to forget her, because she loves Raghuveer. The latter is delighted and Alka tells him to come in the evening to talk to her parents. However, everything goes awry when she learns that Nand has returned. When Nand comes to her house, the two of them argue, but finally both concede that their "love" was just childishness. Now free to profess her love for Raghuveer, Alka goes to his house, only to learn that he has been arrested for black marketing. The movie takes a turn and the court case is with Advocate Desai (Chetan Anand). The court room drama is really engaging as it shows how the black marketers changed the kala bazaar to Safed Bazar and all the people working for Raghuveer, give their opinion which is his positive side. The movie ends with the classic timeless track "Rimjhim Ke Tarane Leke Aayi Barsaat" with Dev Anand and Waheeda Rehman walking in the rain under a single umbrella.

Kala Bazar was Vijay Anand's second directorial venture after the success of his debut venture Nau Do Gyarah. His writing was multi-layered, where he enmeshed a charming love story inside the central plot of going the wrong (illegal) way in life. There were some very unconvincing conflicts like how the 8th pass Raghuveer showed a sudden keen interest towards gaining knowledge because of Alka. Coincidentally, he also accidentally stumbles upon a BA scholar (Krishan Dhawan) who takes his tuitions. But the pacing was very fast and kept the viewer engaged.

Like in Nau Do Gyarah, where he stationed a major portion of the film in the hill station of Mahabaleshwar, here, Vijay Anand explores the beauty of the South Indian hill station Ooty. Dev Anand kept strolling through the gardens of Ooty in the song "Khoya Khoya Chand" in his trademark swaying motion where he kept swinging his arms all through. It might appear rather funny today, but back then it was Dev Anand's patented dancing style which he continued for years to come. The scene immediately after the song was considerably bold by the 60s standards, where Waheeda Rehman removes her sari to use it as a cord to pull Dev Anand up, when he slips down from the cliff. 

Vijay Anand also very intelligently incorporated the real-life premiere footage of the film Mother India in the initial reels of Kala Bazar, thereby adding immense (cameo) star value to the film, showing the likes of Dilip Kumar, Nargis, Guru Dutt, Geeta Dutt, Rajendra Kumar, Sohrab Modi, Kishore Kumar, Mohammad Rafi, Lata Mangeshkar and many more names. Years later, Manmohan Desai and Farah Khan replicated the same formula in their films Naseeb (1981) and Om Shanti Om (2007) respectively an to good effect.

Cast
Dev Anand as Raghuveer
Waheeda Rehman as Alka Sinha
Vijay Anand as Nand Kumar Chattopadhyay
Chetan Anand as Advocate Desai
Nanda as Sapna
Madan Puri as Ganesh
Rashid Khan as Kalu
 Kartar Singh as sikh man in the bank 
Leela Chitnis as Raghuveer's Mother
Mumtaz Begum as Mrs. Sinha 
M. A. Latif as M. L. Sinha 
Sushil Kumar as Raghuveer's Brother
Krishan Dhawan as Sapna's Boyfriend
Amrit Pal as Raghuveer's Gang Member
Kishore Sahu as Public Prosecutor
Jagdish Raj as Black Marketeer of Ticket
Helen as Dancer / Singer

Music
Songs are composed by S. D. Burman. Lyrics are by Shailendra.

Critical response
Vijay Lokapally of The Hindu called Kala Bazar a "timeless classic".

References

External links
 

1960s Hindi-language films
Films scored by S. D. Burman
Films directed by Vijay Anand